Sylvanus Anderton, better known as Syl Anderton, (born 1907, died in 1983 in Bolton, Lancashire, England
) was a British motorcycle dealer and Grand Prix motorcycle racer.

Syl and his brother James Anderton founded Anderton Bros. Motor Cycles Ltd. in Bolton, Lancashire in 1935. Both brothers qualified as pilots before the war and Syl served as a pilot in the Air Transport Auxiliary during World War II and James in the RAF. The brothers resumed their family motorcycle business after the war. Anderton began his racing career before World War II. In 1949 he competed in his first Isle of Man TT event with brother James in the pits. He also competed in the Ulster Grand Prix 1949 to 1951, riding Triumph and Norton motorcycles between 1949 and 1952. He was also known as a private pilot, owning an Auster Aiglet Trainer.

See also
 1949 Grand Prix motorcycle racing season
 1950 Grand Prix motorcycle racing season
 1951 Grand Prix motorcycle racing season
 1952 Grand Prix motorcycle racing season

References 

 Triumph 500 GP. Twist Grip. 10 September 2011.
 Motorcycle memories. The Bolton News. 27 May 2002.

External links
 G-AMZI at airport-data.com

1907 births
1983 deaths
English motorcycle racers
500cc World Championship riders
Air Transport Auxiliary pilots